Topotes are a local dish of Catemaco, Veracruz, Mexico made from threadfin shad (Dorosoma petenense). 

They are deep fried whole just until almost burned, and served with onion, lime, salt, and corn tortillas.

References

Mexican cuisine
Fish dishes
Deep fried foods
Los Tuxtlas